Lebedinovka is a village on the outskirts of the Kyrgyz capital Bishkek. Administratively, however, it is not part of the city, but is the center of the Alamüdün District of Chüy Region, which surrounds Bishkek. Lebedinovka was established in 1898. Its population was 21,118 in 2021.

Population

References

Populated places in Chüy Region